Clarence James Hickman (1 April 1914 – 24 September 1980) was a British-Canadian mycologist. He is noteworthy for his discovery in 1940 that the oomycete species Phytophthora fragariae is the cause of the disease red stele (aka red core root disease) in strawberry plants.

Early life
Hickman was born in Birmingham, UK.

Education and career
At the University of Birmingham, Hickman graduated in botany with a B.Sc. in 1934, an M.Sc. in 1937, and a Ph.D. in 1936. As a postdoc he was from 1936 to 1938 an assistant in the Ministry of Agriculture Service. From 1938 to 1944 he was a research officer at the Plant Pathology Laboratory at Harpenden. At the University of Birmingham, he was a lecturer from 1944 to 1955 and a reader from 1955 to 1960.

For the British Mycological Society he served as the secretary from 1948 to 1952 and as the president for a one-year term from 1957 to 1958. In 1958 his presidential address gave an excellent summary review of the plant-damaging genus Phytophthora, including the biology of its survival and dispersal, the range of its plant hosts, and its physiological specializations.

In 1960 Hickman moved to Canada. In the botany department of the University of Western Ontario (UWO) he was a full professor from 1960 until he retired as professor emeritus. At UWO he was also of the head of botany department.

Death
He died in London, Ontario.

Selected publications

Articles
 
 
 
 
 
  1966

Books

References

1914 births
1980 deaths
British mycologists
Canadian mycologists
Alumni of the University of Birmingham
Academics of the University of Birmingham
Academic staff of the University of Western Ontario